Cyan Racing is the official motorsport partner to Geely Group Motorsport, formerly the Volvo factory auto racing team, and runs the FIA WTCR programme for Lynk & Co, based in Gothenburg, Sweden. The team’s current drivers are Thed Björk, Yvan Muller, Yann Ehrlacher, Santiago Urrutia and Ma Qing Hua who will drive the Lynk & Co 03 TCR race car.

The team was founded by Jan "Flash" Nilsson as Flash Engineering in 1996.  Christian Dahl bought the team in 2005 and renamed it Polestar Racing. After Dahl sold the Polestar performance road car division to Volvo, the team was renamed Cyan Racing.

History
The Swedish Touring Car Championship was created in 1996, formalising touring car races in the country. Volvo, which had been competing in the BTCC since 1994, partnered with the newly founded, Halmstad-based Flash Engineering racing team, owned by Swedish driver Jan "Flash" Nilsson. Volvo provided financial support and the cars.

In 2005, Nilsson sold the Flash Engineering team to Christian Dahl, and it was renamed Polestar Racing.

Volvo announced in July 2015 that it had purchased Polestar Performance, the production car tuning division of Polestar, as well as the Polestar brand. The Polestar Racing team remained under the direction of Christian Dahl, and was rebranded Cyan Racing.

The company launched the Volvo P1800 Cyan in 2020, a road legal restomod sold in limited numbers.

Cars

Achievements

Flash Engineering initially raced a Volvo 850 Super Touring, built by Tom Walkinshaw Racing (TWR). Team owner Jan Nilsson won the STCC in its inaugural season (1996), as well as 1997. In 1998, Flash moved to a S40 Super Touring, also built by TWR. In 2000, the team moved to Karlstad.

Volvo won the Manufacturer's Championship in 2002, with Flash Engineering winning 6 of the series' 18 rounds. Following the introduction of Super 2000 rules in 2003, the team took over technical development of both the engines and the chassis from Volvo. With the new Volvo S60 S2000, originally built by Prodrive and further developed by Flash Engineering, they won the Manufacturer's Championship again in 2003, with Flash Engineering winning 4 of the series' 16 races.

Tommy Rustad won the 2009 STCC drivers championship driving for Polestar Racing, running a Volvo C30 S2000. 2010 saw Polestar winning the STCC teams' championship.

For the 2011 WTCC season, Polestar entered one Volvo C30, developed from scratch by Polestar, driven by Robert Dahlgren.

2012 saw Polestar racing in the new Swedish break-away touring car championship TTA with a Volvo S60 Solution-F. The team claimed all three titles of the 2012 TTA – Racing Elite League season, including teams', manufacturers' and drivers' title with Fredrik Ekblom.

2013 saw TTA and STCC merging back again as one championship, with Polestar entering five cars for the 2013 season. 2013 and 2014 meant continued success as Thed Björk claimed two straight drivers' titles and the team two consecutive teams' titles. The team claimed the drivers' and teams' titles of the 2014 Scandinavian Touring Car Championship with Thed Björk becoming drivers' champion, Fredrik Ekblom finishing third overall and Prince Carl Philip Bernadotte 12th.

As STCC adopted the TCR technical regulations for the 2017 season, Polestar Cyan Racing decided to leave the championship, joining the Swedish GT series with the Volvo S60 Solution-F and switching to a Lotus Evora GT4 for the 2018 season.

2016 saw the team joining the FIA World Touring Car Championship with Volvo Cars and Polestar, using the S60 model, clinching the drivers' and teams' titles in 2017 with Thed Björk as driver. In 2018 the team cooperated with Yvan Muller Racing, running a pair of Hyundai i30 N TCR with drivers Yvan Muller and Thed Björk, claiming the WTCR teams' title.

The team ran four Lynk & Co cars in the 2019 WTCR, claiming the teams' title and Yvan Muller finishing third in the drivers' championship.

The team claimed the drivers' and teams' title in 2020, with Yann Ehrlacher crowned drivers' champion. 2021 saw the team once again claiming both WTCR titles, with Yann Ehrlacher becoming the first-ever driver to defend his WTCR title.

Environmentally friendly racing
Volvo promoted the use of E85 in the STCC, and that series became the first production car championship series in which bioethanol is allowed, and WTCC. Volvo claims that using E85 results in as much as 80% reduction of fossil-fuel based  emissions. Though experts predicted that ethanol-based cars would be disadvantaged in terms of performance compared to petrol-fueled cars, Polestar's S60, powered by E85, won both the first and second rounds of the 2007 Swedish Touring Car Championship season.

The racing version of the Volvo C30, which was jointly developed by Polestar and Volvo, represents a reversal of the usual process, whereby manufacturers take race-proven innovations and incorporate them into their production cars. With the C30, Volvo has taken technology from the C30 DRIVe street car, and implemented them to make a more fuel efficient race car.

References

External links

Swedish auto racing teams
Swedish Touring Car Championship
Volvo Cars
World Touring Car Championship teams
Official motorsports and performance division of automakers
Racecar constructors
Auto racing teams established in 2005